The Saint-Gervais–Vallorcine railway (French: Ligne de Saint-Gervais-les-Bains-Le Fayet à Vallorcine), also known as the Saint-Gervais–Vallorcine Line, is a single-track  long metre gauge railway in France connecting the SNCF's Saint-Gervais-les-Bains-Le Fayet station with Vallorcine station and the border with Switzerland (Le Châtelard) through Chamonix. Opened in stages between 1901 and 1908 by the Chemins de fer de Paris à Lyon et à la Méditerranée (PLM), it is part of the main SNCF network as far as Vallorcine. To Le Châtelard is run by the Swiss company Transports de Martigny et Régions (TMR), which also operates the Martigny–Châtelard Railway.

History
 1886: Granting of the concession for the Cluses–Chamonix line to the PLM (first concession for a general interest electric line in France)
 3 July 1893: Authorisation for the PLM to build the Saint-Gervais to Chamonix section as metre gauge
 June 1899: Start of works on the first section
 25 July 1901: Opening to Chamonix, 19 km or 11.8 mi (official opening on 12 July)
 25 July 1906: Extension to Argentière
 1 November 1907: Boring of the Col des Montets tunnel
 1 July 1908: Junction with the Martigny–Châtelard Railway
 1958: Introduction of Z 600 EMUs
 1997: Introduction of Z 800 EMUs
 2006: Introduction of Z 850 EMUs; frequency increase between Argentière and Vallorcine
 17 July 2009: Official opening of Chamonix-Aiguille-du-Midi station

Geography

Stations

 
 Chedde
 Servoz
 Vaudagne (request stop)
 Viaduc Sainte Marie (request stop)
 Les Houches
 Taconnaz (request stop)
 Les Bossons
 Les Pélerins
 Les Moussoux (request stop)
 Aiguille du Midi
 Chamonix Mont-Blanc
 Les Praz
 Les Tines
 La Joux (request stop)
 Argentière
 Montroc-le Planet
 Le Buet

Connections
 At Saint-Gervais-les-Bains Le Fayet, with the standard gauge SNCF line from Aix-les-Bains via Annecy and La Roche-sur-Foron (including TGVs from Paris in the winter); and the Mont Blanc tramway (TMB) rack railway. 
 At Chamonix, with the Montenvers Railway, a rack railway.
 In Switzerland, at Le Châtelard, with the Martigny-Châtelard rack railway, which continues to Martigny where it connects with the Lausanne–Brig line of the CFF.

Technical information
 Track gauge: .
 Profile: uphill from the Saint-Gervais-Le Fayet to the col des Montets tunnel (altitude ) then downhill to the border (altitude ). On the steepest sections (4% and more), it had a central rail for braking (and keeping trains immobile in case of electric black-outs), through jaws gripping the rail; it was removed around 1980.
 Electrification through top-contact third rail at 850 V (580 V originally) direct current.
 Main structures:
 Three viaducts, including the Sainte-Marie viaduct in the Houches over the Arve
 Several anti-avalanche galleries
 Control: A command post, named PC Éclair (ECLAIR, or “lightning”, standing for Exploitation Centralisée des Lignes Assistée par Informatique et Radio, which translates to Centralised Control of the Lines Assisted by Computers and Radio), installed in 1991 at Saint-Gervais station, allows centralised control with the help of radio and computers.

Rolling stock

 Three Z 850 electric multiple units (EMUs) made by Stadler. Three additional trainsets were slated to arrive before 2008.
 Five Z 800 105-seat EMUs, delivered in 1997 by ADTranz and Vevey Technologies in a joint purchase with the Martigny-Châtelard.
 Eight Z 600 EMUs and four additional trailers (some out of service), used in busy periods.
 Snowploughs:
 Z 691 (electric)
 Beilhack CN4 (diesel)
 The original Z 200 motor cars have been retired.
 Service wagons: Flats (U 20201 - U 20203) and ballast-carrying (U 20204 and U 20205 (?)).

Activity

This line carries about 500,000 passengers per year, with wide variation: from 500 people per day in the least busy periods up to 10,000 per day in summer and 2500 per day in winter for the ski season. The customer base is quite diverse, from international travellers connecting with the TGVs, to local transportation, most notably for schoolchildren. It is a tourist line and a public service at the same time.

Through trains between Saint-Gervais and Martigny run under the “Mont-Blanc Express” brand.

Since 2005 travel has been free between Servoz and Vallorcine for those with a Chamonix residency card and for valley inhabitants.

References

External links

 Train du Mont-Blanc, dedicated to the line 
 Photos-trains (in French) has pictures of rolling stock

Haute-Savoie
Mountain railways
Metre gauge railways in France
Railway lines in Auvergne-Rhône-Alpes
Railway lines opened in 1901